"Super" Steven Conway (born 6 October 1977 in Hartlepool) is an English professional Super feather/Light/Light welter/Welter/Light middleweight boxer of the 1990s and 2000s who as a professional won the International Boxing Organization (IBO) World light middleweight title against Mihaly Kotai, and lost it to Attila Kovács, and was a challenger for the World Boxing Organization (WBO) Inter-Continental super-featherweight title against Gary Thornhill, and the British Boxing Board of Control (BBBofC) British super featherweight title against Alex Arthur.

References

External links

Image - Steven Conway

1977 births
English male boxers
Middleweight boxers
Light-middleweight boxers
Light-welterweight boxers
Lightweight boxers
Living people
Sportspeople from Hartlepool
Super-featherweight boxers
Welterweight boxers